Maharashtra Vikas Party (Maharashtra Development Party), a political party in the Indian state of Maharashtra. MVP evolved out of the Maratha Mahasangh. MVP had some influence in Akola. In the 1998 local elections, the party had a tie-up with Indian National Congress.

The current status of the party is unclear.

Political parties in Maharashtra
Political parties with year of establishment missing